Kent Kingsley (born 26 September 1978) is a former Australian rules footballer for the North Melbourne Football Club, the Geelong Football Club and the Richmond Football Club in the Australian Football League (AFL).

A full forward, Kingsley was recruited from South Australian National Football League (SANFL) club Woodville-West Torrens along with his twin brother Wade by Port Adelaide, but the brothers were quickly traded to North Melbourne for Paul Geister in 1996. Elevated as a rookie in 1999 AFL season, he made his AFL debut in round 10 that season and kicked six goals against Port Adelaide.

Kingsley was traded to Geelong at the end of the 2000 AFL season.

During his time with Geelong, Kingsley became the side's leading goalkicker from 2002–2005 and was a key option up forward. However, he was often maligned by fans for his inconsistency and inaccuracy in front of goal.

During 2006, Kingsley was dropped from the side midway through the season despite the Cats' lack of other forward options.  At the season's end, Kingsley joined the Richmond Football Club via the Pre Season Draft.

He played only three senior games in 2007 for Richmond, and announced his retirement from AFL football on 28 August 2007.

In 1998 AFL player and entrepreneur Kent Kingsley started his first company (IT web development and database integration) that was bought out by a public software company in 1999. The same year Kent made his AFL debut playing for North Melbourne at the age of 21. Kent's 8 year AFL career saw him play 125 games for three clubs.

Off the field, Kingsley has worked as an internet entrepreneur.

Kent is currently playing for Glen Orden in the Western Region Football League.

References

External links

Murray Kangaroos Football Club players
North Melbourne Football Club players
Geelong Football Club players
Richmond Football Club players
Woodville-West Torrens Football Club players
Australian rules footballers from South Australia
1978 births
Living people
Australian twins
Twin sportspeople